Zénith Football Club is a professional football club based in Cap-Haïtien, Haiti.

Current squad

References

Football clubs in Haiti
Cap-Haïtien